"Skittles & Iced Tea" is a single by Christian hip hop artist Hostyle Gospel featuring John Givez, released on April 19, 2016. The idea of the "Skittles & Iced Tea" song came from the Trayvon Martin/George Zimmerman case. Martin was shot and killed on the way home from a local store to buy Skittles and iced tea. This song represents the freedom, liberty, justice and everything else that the constitution stands for.

See also
Killing of Trayvon Martin

References

Hostyle Gospel songs
2016 songs